Harvey James Neville (born 26 June 2002) is a professional footballer who plays as a right-back for Major League Soccer club Inter Miami. Born in England, he has represented the Republic of Ireland at under-19 level. He is the son of former England player Phil Neville.

Early life
Born on 26 June 2002, Neville is the son of former England international Phil Neville. He began his career in the youth setup of his father's former club, Manchester United. He later moved and played with the youth squads at Manchester City and Spanish club Valencia. 

In 2018, Neville returned to Manchester United. In July 2020, he signed his first professional contract with Manchester United.

Club career
On 7 May 2021, Neville moved to the United States and signed with USL League One club Fort Lauderdale CF, the reserve affiliate of Major League Soccer side Inter Miami. He made his professional debut for the club on 22 May 2021 in a 2–1 defeat against the Chattanooga Red Wolves.

On 26 January 2022, Neville made his non-competitive debut for Inter Miami and scored during a 4–0 pre-season victory over Club Universitario de Deportes.  On 11 May 2022, Neville made his competitive debut for Inter Miami as an 84th minute substitute for DeAndre Yedlin during a 3–1 U.S. Open Cup win at home to Tormenta FC. 

Neville officially joined the Inter Miami first team roster on 23 August 2022, signing a deal through to the end of the 2024 season.

International career
Neville qualifies for Republic of Ireland through his maternal grandmother. In October 2019, Neville was named in the Republic of Ireland U19 squad for the first time. He made his debut later that month in a loss to Denmark.

Career statistics

References

External links
 

2002 births
Living people
Footballers from Manchester
Republic of Ireland association footballers
Republic of Ireland youth international footballers
English footballers
Irish people of English descent
English people of Irish descent
Association football defenders
Manchester United F.C. players
Inter Miami CF II players
Inter Miami CF players
USL League One players
Republic of Ireland expatriate association footballers
English expatriate footballers
Expatriate footballers in Spain
Expatriate soccer players in the United States
Irish expatriate sportspeople in the United States
English expatriate sportspeople in the United States